Pine Brook is an unincorporated community in Isanti County, Minnesota, United States.

The community is located between Cambridge and Princeton at the junction of State Highway 47 (MN 47) and State Highway 95 (MN 95).

Pine Brook is located within Wyanett Township and Springvale Township.  Nearby places also include Bradford, Dalbo, and Springvale County Park.  Pine Brook flows through the community.

References

 Official State of Minnesota Highway Map – 2013/2014 edition

Unincorporated communities in Minnesota
Unincorporated communities in Isanti County, Minnesota